Seem or variants may refer to:

 Société d'Exploitation des Etablissements Morane-Saulnier (SEEMS or SEEM), the successor company to the French aviation manufacturer Morane-Saulnier
 SeeMS, a mass spectrometry viewer software package
 , a parish in Esbjerg Municipality, Denmark
 The Seems, children's novel series by John Hulme
 It Seems (album), 1988 album by Colin Newman
 Seem., taxonomic author abbreviation of, Berthold Carl Seemann (1825–1871), German botanist
 "Seem" Studley (1841–1901), U.S. baseball player

See also

 
 
Seam (disambiguation)
Seim (disambiguation)
Seme (disambiguation)